Hartertiidae is a family of nematodes belonging to the order Rhabditida.

Genera:
 Alainchabaudia Mawson, 1968
 Hartertia Seurat, 1914

References

Nematodes